Sosnowski (feminine: Sosnowska; plural: Sosnowscy) is a Polish surname. It is related to the following surnames in other languages:

People
 Albert Sosnowski (born 1979), Polish boxer
 Antoni Sosnowski (born 1946), Polish politician
 David Sosnowski (born 1959), American novelist
 David J. Sosnowski, American composer and pianist
 Dmitrii Ivanovich Sosnowsky (1886–1953), Soviet botanist
 Jerzy Sosnowski (1896–c. 1944), Polish spy
 Joe Sosnowski (born 1977), American politician
 John B. Sosnowski (1883–1968), American politician
 Józef Sylwester Sosnowski (died 1783), Polish nobleman
 Kajetan Sosnowski (1913–1987), Polish painter
 Lucjan Sosnowski (1934–1999), Polish wrestler
 Monika Sosnowska (born 1971), Polish painter
 Nydia de Sosnowska, actress and wife of Harry Bruno
 Oskar Sosnowski (1880–1939), Polish architect
 V. Susan Sosnowski (born 1955), American politician
 Zbigniew Sosnowski (born 1963), Polish politician
 Zenon Sosnowski (1931 - 2014), Polish medical researcher and lecturer

See also
 
 

Polish-language surnames